Christopher William Guthrie (born 7 September 1953) is an English former professional footballer who played as a forward in the Football League.

References

External links
 

1953 births
Living people
English footballers
Sportspeople from Hexham
Footballers from Northumberland
Association football forwards
Newcastle United F.C. players
Southend United F.C. players
Sheffield United F.C. players
Millwall F.C. players
Swindon Town F.C. players
Fulham F.C. players
Roda JC Kerkrade players
English Football League players